Oenobotys invinacealis is a moth in the family Crambidae. It was described by Alexander Douglas Campbell Ferguson, D. J. Hilburn and B. Wright in 1991. It is found on Bermuda.

References

Moths described in 1991
Pyraustinae